Intercity Bus Station of Thessaloniki "Macedonia", also known as the KTEL Macedonia Intercity Bus station, is the main bus station of Thessaloniki, Greece and the largest bus terminal in Greece. It is located just 5km from the city center in Menemeni. Construction began in October 1996 and it was opened to the public in September 2002. It serves about 20 to 25 thousand passengers and 800 coaches departures per day to various cities all over Greece, as well as some routes to Albania, Bulgaria, North Macedonia, Germany and Turkey. It is connected with the rest of the city via OASTH, which operates about 120 buses per hour. The company, which operates the buses and owns the station is named KTEL. This terminal serves 40 KTEL (the bus companies in Greece for each province) routes, as well as some other bus lines internationally.

Destinations

References

Bus stations in Greece
Transport in Thessaloniki
Buildings and structures in Thessaloniki